Pablo Fabricio Siles Morales (born 15 July 1997) is a Uruguayan professional footballer who plays as a midfielder for Athletico Paranaense.

Club career
A youth academy graduate of Danubio, Siles made his professional debut on 28 May 2017 in a 1–1 draw against Sud América. He scored his first goal on 12 February 2019 in a 3–2 Copa Libertadores defeat against Atlético Mineiro.

Following Danubio's relegation from top division after 2020 season, Siles joined Brazilian club Vitória on a season long loan deal.

International career
Siles is a former Uruguay youth international. On 29 June 2019, he was named in Uruguay's 18-man squad for 2019 Pan American Games. He played two matches in group stage as Uruguay eventually finished fourth in the tournament.

Career statistics

Club

References

External links
 

1997 births
Living people
People from Melo, Uruguay
Association football midfielders
Uruguayan footballers
Uruguay youth international footballers
Uruguayan Primera División players
Campeonato Brasileiro Série A players
Campeonato Brasileiro Série B players
Danubio F.C. players
Esporte Clube Vitória players
Club Athletico Paranaense players
Cruzeiro Esporte Clube players
Uruguayan expatriate footballers
Uruguayan expatriate sportspeople in Brazil
Expatriate footballers in Brazil